This is a list of appointments as Escheator of Leinster, a notional 'office of profit under the crown' which was used three times to resign from the Irish House of Commons.

The office was formerly substantive. It was founded in 1605, when the escheatorship for Ireland was divided among the provinces of Connaught, Leinster, Munster, and Ulster. The first holder was Nicholas Kenny, who had been escheator-general of Ireland.

Substantive holders 

1605: Nicholas Kenny
9 February 1644: Sir Maurice Eustace, later Lord  Chancellor  of  Ireland
Patrick Tallant (d. 1663?)
1663: Francis Leigh
in 1739: Lewis Meares
1752: George Meares

Members of the Irish House of Commons 
1798: Sir John Tydd, 1st Baronet (Clogher)
1799: Charles Kendal Bushe (Callan)
1800: Thomas Stannus (Portarlington)

After the Acts of Union 1800, the office was retained as a sinecure, with occasional legal duties. Walter Glascock was appointed about 1801, and his appointment was renewed by letters patent in 1830, 1837, and 1838. In the latter year, however, all of the Irish escheatorships were abolished by the Lord Lieutenant of Ireland.

Notes

References

See also 
Escheator
Resignation from the British House of Commons

Lists of British people
Government of the United Kingdom
Lists of Irish parliamentarians
Lists of Irish people